The Journal of Orthopaedic Surgery and Research is a peer-reviewed open access medical journal covering orthopedic surgery and the general study of the musculoskeletal system. It was established in 2006 and is published by BioMed Central. The editor-in-chief is Nicola Maffulli (Queen Mary University of London). According to the Journal Citation Reports, the journal has a 2018/2019 impact factor of 1.907.

References

BioMed Central academic journals
Orthopedics journals
Publications established in 2006
English-language journals